Nig (also Romanized as Nīg; also known as Nīk, Naik, Neyk) is a village in Afriz Rural District, Sedeh District, Qaen County, South Khorasan Province, Iran. At the 2006 census, its population was 595, in 150 families.

References 

Populated places in Qaen County